CB-4 could refer to:

 , a never-finished 
 The film CB4
 The Cambridge postal area